Konstantinos Thanos (born 1 January 1973) is a Greek wrestler who participated in the 2000 Summer Olympics in Athens.

References

1973 births
Living people
Wrestlers at the 2000 Summer Olympics
Greek male sport wrestlers
Mediterranean Games silver medalists for Greece
Mediterranean Games medalists in wrestling
Competitors at the 2001 Mediterranean Games
Olympic wrestlers of Greece
Sportspeople from Karditsa
21st-century Greek people